Keven Steven Alemán-Bustos (born 25 March 1994) is a Canadian professional soccer player who plays as an attacking midfielder.

Club career

Early career
Alemán was born in San José, Costa Rica and moved to Brampton, Ontario when he was 10. He attended St. Edmund Campion Secondary School. Keven started playing with Brampton A as soon as he moved to Brampton. Before joining Toronto FC, he played on the Under 16 Ontario Provincial Team coached by Patrick Tobo which also featured fellow players Bryce Alderson and Quillan Roberts. After the Provincial team he joined the TFC Academy in the Canadian Soccer League. Alemán showed great promise along with other Canadians Michael Petrasso and Dylan Carreiro, however all three players left over various issues with Aron Winter, the club's manager at the time. Before leaving to go on trial in Europe, Keven had his rights traded by Toronto FC to the Vancouver Whitecaps in return for Terry Dunfield. However, after a successful trial period in 2011 and attaining his visa, Alemán was able to join the youth ranks at Real Valladolid in Spain.

Herediano
In August 2014, Alemán left Real Valladolid to join C.S. Herediano of Costa Rica. He was unveiled by the team on August 7 with fellow signee Antonio Pedroza. He debuted for Herediano on September 11 in a friendly, and scored a goal for the side in a 3–1 victory. Alemán made his league debut more than two months later on November 30 in a 1–0 victory over Santos de Guápiles.

Alemán was loaned out to fellow Costa Rican side Belén in January 2015, for the remainder of the season. He made his debut for the team against Carmelita on January 2. He scored his first goal for Belén against Limón in a 1–4 loss on February 14.

Belén
In July 2016, Aleman transferred to Belén, in order to accommodate his request for more playing time.

Saprissa
In December 2016, it was announced that Aleman had signed a 2.5 year contract with Saprissa. In January 2018, it was announced that Aleman had left the club after one year.

Sacramento Republic
In January 2018, Alemán signed with USL side Sacramento Republic FC for the 2018 season.

FC Edmonton
On 24 March 2020, Alemán signed with Canadian Premier League side FC Edmonton. He made his debut for the Eddies on August 16 against Forge FC.

Valour FC
On 2 February 2021, Alemán returned to Costa Rica, signing with Liga FPD side Guadalupe. Two days later, it was clarified that he had signed with Valour FC and was being sent on loan to Guadalupe for the remainder of the 2020–21 Liga FPD.

Atlético Ottawa
On 26 January 2022, Alemán signed a one-year contract with an option for 2023 with Atlético Ottawa.

International career
Alemán was eligible for both Costa Rica and Canada. He began with numerous training camps with Sean Flemming's U17 Canadian side in April 2011 and eventually became a large part of the group leading through the Concacaf championship onto the World Cup. He was a part of Canada's U17 soccer team, making his debut in the 2011 FIFA U-17 World Cup. He was also a part of Canada's 2013 CONCACAF U-20 Championship team. Alemán would later reveal to media that Jorge Luis Pinto had approached him about representing Costa Rica in December 2012, a month before the U-20 tournament. He declined, stating he was committed to the Canadian program.

On June 27, 2013 Alemán was listed as a part of the confirmed 23-man squad for Colin Miller's Canada squad for 2013 CONCACAF Gold Cup. Alemán made his senior debut for Canada against Mexico July 11 as a second-half substitute for Kyle Bekker, the game ended in a 2–0 defeat.

After more than three years out of the national team picture, Alemán returned to the side under coach Octavio Zambrano, appearing in a 1–0 defeat to El Salvador on October 8, 2017.

Honours

Atlético Ottawa 
 Canadian Premier League
Regular Season: 2022

Career statistics

International statistics 

Statistics as of October 8, 2017

References

External links

1994 births
Living people
Association football midfielders
Canadian soccer players
Costa Rican men's footballers
Footballers from San José, Costa Rica
Costa Rican emigrants to Canada
Naturalized citizens of Canada
Canadian expatriate soccer players
Costa Rican expatriate footballers
Expatriate footballers in Spain
Canadian expatriate sportspeople in Spain
Costa Rican expatriate sportspeople in Spain
Expatriate soccer players in the United States
Canadian expatriate sportspeople in the United States
Costa Rican expatriate sportspeople in the United States
Toronto FC players
Real Valladolid Promesas players
C.S. Herediano footballers
Belén F.C. players
Deportivo Saprissa players
Sacramento Republic FC players
FC Edmonton players
Valour FC players
Guadalupe F.C. players
Atlético Ottawa players
Canadian Soccer League (1998–present) players
Tercera División players
Liga FPD players
USL Championship players
Canadian Premier League players
Canada men's youth international soccer players
Canada men's under-23 international soccer players
Canada men's international soccer players
Footballers at the 2015 Pan American Games
2013 CONCACAF Gold Cup players
Pan American Games competitors for Canada
Soccer players from Brampton